Oakdale Memorial Gardens, formerly Oakdale Cemetery, is located in east-central Davenport, Iowa. It contains a section for the burial of pets called the Love of Animals Petland. In 2015, the cemetery was listed as an historic district on the National Register of Historic Places, and as a local landmark on the Davenport Register of Historic Properties.  It is also listed on the Network to Freedom, a National Park Service registry for sites associated with the Underground Railroad.

History

Oakdale was established as a non-profit cemetery by a group of Davenport businessmen as an alternative to the overcrowded Davenport City Cemetery and the for-profit Pine Hill Cemetery. It was incorporated as the Oakdale Cemetery Company May 14, 1856. The cemetery board hired Captain George F. de la Roche, who had finished the design of Oak Hill Cemetery in Washington, D.C. five years earlier, to complete the design and platting of the cemetery. It was designed as a rural or garden cemetery, but it transitioned to a landscape-lawn cemetery beginning in the late 19th century. The first numbered burial at Oakdale was that of three-month-old Mary Larned Allen on September 15, 1857, though several earlier burials were recorded at a later date, some from as early as October, 1855. Some of the graves in the cemetery had been transferred from the overcrowded City Cemetery in the west end. The cemetery is located across Eastern Avenue from the former Iowa Soldiers' Orphans' Home, and it contains the graves of the orphans that died at the home. There are also at least 11 graves of former slaves who escaped to freedom by way of the Underground Railroad, which led to its inclusion on the Network to Freedom.

Two special receiving vaults were built in the cemetery, although neither exists anymore.  A brick vault was constructed in 1873 for those who died in the winter when the ground was frozen.  A wooden vault was built next to it in 1918 because of the large number of deaths as a result of the Spanish flu epidemic.

Architecture
The cemetery entrance is marked by a set of monumental gates, designed in the Art Nouveau style by Davenport architect Edward Hammatt in 1895. Construction of the gates was completed in 1896.

The cemetery is also home to several private mausoleums.  William D. Petersen was the son of J.H.C. Petersen who founded a department store in Davenport that has become Von Maur.  He also was responsible for the development of the city's riverfront and built the LeClaire Park Bandshell there.  His mausoleum was designed in the Gothic Revival style by Davenport architects Rudolph Clausen & Walter Kruse. It was inspired by his wife Sara's desire for a tomb similar to the ones she saw in Europe. It was constructed by Presbrey Leland of Valhalla, New York in 1921 for $60,000. The exterior is composed of limestone from Greece.  The interior features crypts that were carved from Greek marble and a ceramic tile ceiling that was designed and completed by the Guastavino Tile Company of Woburn, Massachusetts.

Joseph W. Bettendorf was an industrialist for whom the city of Bettendorf, Iowa is named.  His mausoleum was built in 1923 in the Egyptian Revival style for $150,000.  Its exterior is composed of Barre Granite from Vermont.  The interior features crypts carved from white marble and Egyptian-inspired stained glass windows.

The mausoleum built for Johannna Schricker, widow of Davenport lumber magnate Lorenzo Schricker, was designed in the Neoclassical style by Davenport architect John W. Ross.  It was built by the Vermont Marble Company in 1899 at a cost of $6,489.  The inspiration for the structure was the North Portico of the White House in Washington, D.C.  Its exterior is composed of Sutherland Falls white marble and features a bronze roof supplied by the Winslow Brothers of Chicago.

Soldiers' Lot

There is a Soldiers' Lot near the center of the cemetery, which is administered by the U.S. Department of Veterans Affairs.  At one time 174 soldiers were buried at Oakdale, including the first Iowans to die in the Civil War at the Battle of Fort Donelson. Most of the bodies were transferred in 1888 to Rock Island National Cemetery or Keokuk National Cemetery. The remaining 14 soldiers' graves were moved to the Grand Army of the Republic (GAR) plot in 1900.  The plot was transferred from the GAR to the cemetery association in 1940 and the United States government took possession of it the following year.  Today it contains the remains of 71 soldiers from the Civil War and Spanish–American War.

Notable burials
 Alfred T. Andreas (1839–1900), book publisher and historian
 Bix Beiderbecke (1903–1931) jazz musician
 Joseph W. Bettendorf (1864–1933), co-founder of the Bettendorf Axel Company with his brother; Bettendorf, Iowa is named after him
 William P. Bettendorf (1857–1910), inventor and co-founder of the Bettendorf Axel Company with his brother; Bettendorf, Iowa is named after him
 Henry Peter Bosse (1844–1903), photographer, cartographer and civil engineer
 Alice Braunlich (1888–1989), professor and classical philologist
 Frederick G. Clausen (1848–1940), architect; founder of oldest architectural firm in continuous existence in the state of Iowa
 Rudolph J. Clausen (1878–1961), architect; son and partner of Frederick G. Clausen
 John Parsons Cook (1817–1872), U.S. House of Representatives, 1853–1855
 Eloise Blaine Cram (1896–1957), zoologist and parasitologist
 George Henry Cram (1838–1872), American Civil War Brevet Brigadier General
 Ralph W. Cram (1869–1952), newspaper editor and aviator
 Edward Savage Crossett (1828–1910), lumber baron
 John Forrest Dillon (1831–1914), Jurist who authored a judicial treatise that is now referred to as "Dillon's Law."
 Nicholas Fejérváry (1811–1895) Hungarian nobleman
 Alice French (1850–1934), author who wrote under the pseudonym Octave Thanet
 James Grant (1812–1891), first president of the Chicago, Rock Island and Pacific Railroad, Speaker of the Iowa House of Representatives
 Edward Hammatt (1856–1907), architect
 Rebecca J. Keck (1838–1904), physician and patent medicine entrepreneur
 Joseph R. Lane (1858–1931), U.S. House of Representatives, 1899–1901
 Joseph Bloomfield Leake (1828–1918), American Civil War Brevet Brigadier General
 Henry Washington Lee (1815–1874), first bishop of the Episcopal Diocese of Iowa 1854–1874
 John Fremont McCullough (1871–1963), co-founded Dairy Queen
 Paul Norton (1909–1984), watercolor artist
 Ernest Carl Oberholtzer (1884–1977), explorer, author and conservationist
 Dr. Charles Christopher Parry (1823–1890), botanist and mountaineer
 Hiram Price (1814–1901), U.S. House of Representatives, 1863–1869, 1877–1881; U.S. Commissioner of Indian Affairs, 1881–1885
 John W. Ross (1830–1914), architect
 Addison Hiatt Sanders (1823–1912), American Civil War Brevet Brigadier General
 Phebe Sudlow (1831–1922), first female public school superintendent in the United States; first female professor at the University of Iowa
 James Thorington (1816–1887), U.S. House of Representatives, 1855–1857; Consul at Aspinwall, Colombia, 1873–1882
 John Vale (1835–1909), American Civil War Medal of Honor recipient
 Charles J. von Maur (1863–1926), department store chain co-founder

References

External links

 
 
 
 

Geography of Davenport, Iowa
Cemeteries in the Quad Cities
Protected areas of Scott County, Iowa
Historic American Landscapes Survey in Iowa
National Register of Historic Places in Davenport, Iowa
Cemeteries on the National Register of Historic Places in Iowa
Historic districts in Davenport, Iowa
Historic districts on the National Register of Historic Places in Iowa
Davenport Register of Historic Properties
United States national cemeteries